Alexander A. Reinert is a professor of law at the Benjamin N. Cardozo School of Law of Yeshiva University in New York City. Professor Reinert specializes in the areas of civil procedure, civil rights law, rights of prisoners and detainees, and constitutional law.

Professor Reinert received his bachelor's degree from Brown University in 1994 and his juris doctor from New York University in 1999.  Following law school, he clerked for Harry T. Edwards, DC Circuit Court of Appeals, followed by Supreme Court Justice Stephen Breyer.

Professor Reinert conducts research in the areas of constitutional law, civil procedure, and criminal law.  His articles have appeared in the Stanford Law Review, the University of Illinois Law Review, the Virginia Law Review, and the University of Pennsylvania Law Review, among other journals.

He is married to fellow Cardozo professor Betsy Ginsberg.

Arguing Ashcroft v. Iqbal

Reinert is also well known for having litigated and argued the United States Supreme Court case Ashcroft v. Iqbal.  The Supreme Court ultimately decided that Iqbal had not stated, with sufficient specificity, a claim against John Ashcroft and other high ranking governmental officials, sending Reinert and his client back to rewrite the complaint.

See also 
 List of law clerks of the Supreme Court of the United States (Seat 2)

References 

Living people
American legal scholars
Cardozo School of Law faculty
Law clerks of the Supreme Court of the United States
Year of birth missing (living people)

Brown University alumni
New York University School of Law alumni